The Community of Metros (COMET), formerly CoMET and Nova groups, is a multinational collection of metro systems focusing on international benchmarking, facilitated by the Transport Strategy Centre (TSC) at Imperial College London. The Community of Metros consist of 42 metro systems in 39 cities around the world. The groups are jointly owned and steered by the various members.

COMET benchmarking
The four main objectives of the metro benchmarking groups are:

 To share knowledge and identify best practices in a confidential environment
 To support members in achieving their operational and strategic goals – focusing on improvements
 To build systems of measures for use by management and to establish public transport best practices
 To prioritise areas for improvement and support decision-making for management, boards, government, and other stakeholders

The key performance indicator (KPI) system is used by the COMET during the benchmarking process in order to compare performance across the member metro systems. The purpose of benchmarking is to search for best practices that lead to superior performance. There are approximately 30 top-level indicators, which are designed to measure the overall performance of the organisation in six distinct areas:
 Growth, learning, and innovation
 Financial
 Customer
 Internal processes
 Safety and security
 Environment

The indicators are reviewed by members on an annual basis. The group members operate under a full confidentiality agreement. This allows for full data and information exchange within the COMET but not externally.

Statistical analyses are used to provide greater understanding of the results, while time series analyses allow for trends in performance to be identified. This helps to highlight which members are changing their practices and what improvements are relatively achievable. Where clear differences or improvements in performance are identified, detailed analysis is carried out through case studies. Multiple case studies are conducted in the COMET each year; these studies include detailed data analysis, questionnaires, and interviews with functional experts. Case studies are further supported by expert workshops where appropriate. In many cases, best practices may be found outside the metro industry, so other public transport operations and even other industries are reviewed for relevant practices.

Membership
 the Community of Metros consisted of 43 metro systems located in 39 cities around the world.

Americas
  Buenos Aires Underground
  Honolulu Rail Transit, since 28 May 2022
  Metro Rio
  Mexico City Metro
  Montreal Metro
  New York City Subway
  OC Transpo, since 15 May 2019
  PATH, since 7 April 2022
  Santiago Metro
  São Paulo Metro
  San Francisco BART, since 18 January 2018
  Toronto Subway
  Washington Metro, since 2 January 2018
  Vancouver Light Rapid Transit, since 30 September 2016

Asia and Oceania
  Bangalore Namma Metro, since 24 February 2020
  Bangkok MRT
  Beijing Subway
  Delhi Metro
  Dubai Metro
  Guangzhou Metro
  Hong Kong MTR
  Kuala Lumpur RapidKL Rail, since 4 November 2013
  MRT Jakarta, since 30 September 2021
  Nanjing Metro, since 4 October 2013
  Seoul Metro, since 1 September 2013
  Shanghai Metro
  Shenzhen Metro, since 10 July 2015
  Singapore MRT
  Sydney Metro, since 29 December 2019
  Sydney Trains
  Tokyo Metro, since 20 January 2020
  Taipei Metro

Europe
  Barcelona Metro
  Berlin U-Bahn
  Brussels Metro
  Istanbul Metro, since 20 February 2014
  Lisbon Metro
  London DLR, since 4 December 2013
  London Underground
  Madrid Metro
  Newcastle Metro
  Oslo Metro, since 23 September 2014
  Paris Métro and Paris RER

Former members
  Moscow Metro (membership ceased in March 2022 )

Major publications
Some of the major publication journals by COMET include:
 Canavan S, Barron A, Cohen J, Graham DJ, Anderson RJ et al. (2019). Best Practices in Operating High Frequency Metro Services, Transportation Research Record.
Anupriya A, Graham D, Anderson R, Carbo JM et al. (2018). Cost Function for Urban Rail Transport Systems, Transportation Research Board 98th Annual Meeting.
Canavan, S., Graham, D.J., Anderson, R.J., Barron, A. (2017). Urban Metro Rail Demand: Evidence from Dynamic Generalised Method of Moments (GMM) Estimates using Panel Data.
 Hörcher, D., Graham, D. J., and Anderson, R. J. (2017). Crowding cost estimation with large scale smart card and vehicle location data. TRANSPORTATION RESEARCH PART B: METHODOLOGICAL, 95, 105–125.
 Singh, R., Graham, D.J., Anderson, R.  (2017) Characterising journey time performance on urban metro systems.  TransitData conference, Santiago, Chile, 22 May 2017.
 Hörcher,D., Graham,D.J., Anderson,R., (2017) Crowding cost estimation with large scale smart card and vehicle location data, Transportation Research Part B: Methodological, pp. 105–125.
 Brage-Ardao, R., Graham, D.J., Anderson, R.J., Barron, A. (2017). Metro Operating Costs: Main Patterns and Determinants. Transportation Research Board 96th Annual Meeting.

References

External links
Community of Metros Website
Transport Strategy Centre at Imperial College London

Rapid transit